"Awnaw" (featuring Jazze Pha) is the first single by the Kentucky rap group Nappy Roots, produced by James "Groove" Chambers. It was released in 2001, taken from Nappy Roots's first album Watermelon, Chicken & Gritz (2002). It peaked at number 51 in the U.S. and features vocals by Jazze Pha who sang the hook/chorus. The instrumental portions are often used on the public radio program This American Life.

Music video
The music video was released in 2002. The video for the rock remix was released later on that year.

Remixes 
The main official remix features Jazze Pha, Cam'ron and Twista and the second official remix is a rap rock remix featuring Jazze Pha and Marcos Curiel from P.O.D. who performs a guitar solo that was featured on the soundtrack of Madden 2003.

Track listing 
Radio Edit
Album Version
Instrumental
Acappella
Rock Remix

Charts

Weekly charts

Year-end charts

References

2001 debut singles
Nappy Roots songs
2001 songs
Atlantic Records singles